Jan Terje Gravningen (born 21 September 1945) is a former speedway rider from Norway.

Speedway career 
Gravningen is a former champion of Norway, winning the Norwegian Championship in 1975.

He rode in the top tier of British Speedway from 1973 until 1977, riding for the Halifax Dukes and Birmingham Brummies.

References 

1945 births
Living people
Norwegian speedway riders
Birmingham Brummies riders
Halifax Dukes riders
Norwegian expatriate sportspeople in England